The Trade, Development and Cooperation Agreement (TDCA) is a treaty concluded between the European Community and South Africa. The treaty consists of three areas of agreement. First of all, it includes a free trade agreement between the EU and South Africa. Secondly, it includes development aid. Thirdly, it includes several areas of cooperation, such as economic and social cooperation.

The TDCA was signed in 1999 and came into force in 2004.

References

Treaties entered into by the European Union
Treaties concluded in 1999
Treaties entered into force in 2004
Free trade agreements of the European Union
Free trade agreements of South Africa
Treaties of South Africa